The Confederation of All Indonesian Workers' Unions (KSPSI) is a national trade union center in Indonesia. It was formed from the All-Indonesia Union of Workers, which was the only legally registered trade union in Indonesia during the Suharto era.

References

Trade unions in Indonesia